Cleveland Township is a township in Walsh County, North Dakota, United States. 53.5% (53) of the population are male, and the other 46.5% (46) are female.

References

See also
Walsh County, North Dakota

Townships in North Dakota
Townships in Walsh County, North Dakota